Niyazgulovo (Niyaźğol) is a rural locality (a village) in Abzanovsky Selsoviet, Zianchurinsky District, Bashkortostan, Russia. The population was 119 as of 2010. There are 2 streets.

Geography 
Niyazgulovo is located 47 km south of Isyangulovo (the district's administrative centre) by road. Abzanovo is the nearest rural locality.

References 

Rural localities in Zianchurinsky District